The Kasper Salin Prize is a prize awarded annually by Architects Sweden to a Swedish building or building project "of high architectural quality". It is considered the most prestigious architectural prize in the country and has been awarded since 1962. The award is distributed to the building itself and consists of a bronze relief, designed by Swedish architect Bengt Lindroos (1918–2010), which is attached to the building.

Winners
Several years (1965, 1973, 1990, 2004) have seen two winners, and no prize was awarded in 1976.
 Markuskyrkan, Stockholm (1962)
 PUB annex, Stockholm (1963)
 City hall, Kiruna (1964)
 Malmö University Faculty of Education, Malmö (1965)
 Crematorium, Gävle (1965)
 Åhléns, Stockholm (1966)
 Medborgarhuset, Örebro (1967)
 Vildanden, Lund (1968)
 Televerket's administrative buildings, Stockholm (1969)
 Kvarteret Barberaren, Sandviken (1970)
 Pharmacia building, Uppsala (1971)
 Temporary house of parliament, Stockholm (1972)
 Tekniska högskolan metro station, Stockholm (1973)
 Stadion metro station, Stockholm (1973)
 Malmö Konsthall, Malmö (1974)
 Sport- och simhall, Sollentuna (1975)
 No prize awarded in 1976
 Rudolf Steinerseminariet, Järna (1977)
 Silvertältet, Solna (1978)
 Solbacka, Norrtälje (1979)
 Stockholm University Allhuset, Stockholm (1980)
 Museum of Ethnography, Sweden, Stockholm (1981)
 Arrivals terminal, Stockholm Arlanda Airport, Sigtuna (1982)
 Kvarteret Varmfronten, Stockholm (1983)
 , Gävle (1984)
 Spårvagnshallarna, Gothenburg (1985)
 Kvarteret Drottningen, Stockholm (1986)
 Leksands kulturhus, Leksand (1987)
 Öijareds Executive Country Club, Floda (1988)
 Chapel crematorium, Linköping (1989)
 , Stockholm (1990)
 Vasa Museum, Stockholm (1990)
  (1991)
 Kvarteret Nielsen, Borås (1992)
 Astra Hässle research facility, Mölndal (1993)
 Tekniska verken, Linköping (1994)
 Gothenburg School of Business, Economics and Law, Gothenburg (1995)
 Nils Ericson Terminal, Gothenburg (1996)
 Malmö City Library, Malmö (1997)
 Museum of Architecture, Stockholm (1998)
 Millesgården, Stockholm (1999)
 Kvarteret Slottet, Helsingborg (2000)
 Chalmers Students' Union building, Gothenburg (2001)
 Pier F, Stockholm Arlanda Airport, Sigtuna (2002)
 Kvarteret Katsan, White, Stockholm (2003)
 Museum of World Culture, Gothenburg (2004)
 Södertörn University Library, Huddinge (2004)
 Sjöstadsparterren, Stockholm (2005)
 , Kungsbacka (2006)
 House of Sweden, Washington D.C., United States (2007)
 , Kalmar (2008)
 , Malmö (2009)
 Ryaverket, Gothenburg (2010)
 Triangeln station, Malmö (2011)
 Lund Cathedral Forum, Lund (2012)
 New crematorium at Skogskyrkogården, Stockholm (2013)
 Kulturväven, Umeå (2014)
 KTH School of Architecture, Stockholm (2015)
 , Gothenburg (2016)
 Museum of Sketches for Public Art, Lund (2017)
 Ateljébostad, Hamra (2018)
 Bostadsrättsföreningen Viva, Gothenburg (2019)
 House of Culture (Kulturhuset), Stockholm (2020)

References

External links
Sveriges Arkitekter website
Kasper Salin-priset website

Architecture awards
Architecture in Sweden
Awards established in 1962
Swedish awards